Barbuda is an island located in the eastern Caribbean forming part of the sovereign state of Antigua and Barbuda. It is located north of the island of  Antigua and is part of the Leeward Islands of the West Indies. The island is a popular tourist destination because of its moderate climate and coastline.

Historically, most of Barbuda's 1,634 residents have lived in the town of Codrington. However, in September 2017, Hurricane Irma damaged or destroyed 95% of the island's buildings and infrastructure and, as a result, all the island's inhabitants were evacuated to Antigua, leaving Barbuda empty for the first time in modern history. By February 2019, most of the residents had returned to the island.

History

The Pre-Arawakan peoples inhabited the area in the Stone Age. The island was populated by Arawak and Carib Indians when Christopher Columbus landed on his second voyage in 1493. Early settlements by the Spanish were followed by the French and English who formed a colony in 1666.

In 1685, Barbuda was leased to brothers John and Christopher Codrington, who had founded the town of Codrington.  The Codrington family produced food and transported enslaved people as labour for their sugarcane plantations on Antigua. During the 1740s, there were multiple slave rebellions at Codrington. 

On 1 November 1981, the island gained its independence as an integral part of Antigua and Barbuda.

Slavery
There is a widespread but disputed belief, shared by some Barbudans, that the Codringtons set up a human stock farm on Barbuda for the purpose of breeding the strongest, tallest enslaved people. An article in the Annals of the New York Academy of Science has disputed this, stating that the Codringtons considered using Barbuda as a nursery, where slave children would have been raised to work on Antiguan plantations, but this plan was never realized.  Other sources indicate that enslaved people were, in fact, an export commodity but this was probably due to natural population growth since no new slaves had arrived on the island since the mid-1700s.

According to a calculation made in 1977 by Lowenthal and Clark, 172 enslaved people were sent to other islands between 1779 and 1834. The majority were transported to Antigua, but 37 were sent to the Leeward and Windward islands, and some to the southern states of America. On the island, there were a number of slave uprisings, with the most significant occurring in 1834–1835.

Britain emancipated slaves in most of its colonies in 1834, including Barbuda as an island dependency of the main colony of Antigua. For some years afterward, the freed enslaved people had little opportunity of survival on their own because of limited agricultural land and the lack of available credit to buy some. Therefore, they continued to work on the plantations for nominal wages or lived in shantytowns and worked as occasional labourers. Sugarcane production remained the primary economy for over a century. Effective trade unions were not formed until the 1930s.

The first map of Barbuda was made in the second half of the 18th century. At that time there were substantial buildings in the Highland area, a castle in Codrington, a fort on the river, now known as the Martello Tower, and houses at Palmetto Point, Coco Point, and Castle Hill. The map shows eight catching pens for holding captured runaway slaves, indicating that this was a common occurrence. There were several defensive cannon batteries around the island perimeter, as well as a large plantation in the Meadow and Guava area and another large plantation in the Highlands.

Barbuda Land Act

The Barbuda Land Act of 2007 establishes that the citizens of Barbuda communally own the land. The act specifies that residents must provide consent for major development projects on the island. The Government of Antigua and Barbuda passed the act on January 17, 2008.

Natural disasters

Hurricane Luis

One of the most devastating hurricanes to strike the northern Leeward Islands in the 20th century, Hurricane Luis, a Category 4 storm, caused very extensive destruction to Barbuda in September 1995. Most houses were damaged or destroyed, with three deaths, 165 injuries, and power and water system disruptions. The hurricane left over 300 homeless; many lived in shelters for months. Estimated cost of rebuilding ranged from $100 million to $350 million. Not all damaged buildings were replaced, and in early 2013, only two very expensive hotels were operating in addition to a few cottages that were for rent. In fact, there were very few facilities for tourists. A report in early 2017 confirmed that there were still only two hotels; the primary attractions were the pristine beaches. Many of the accommodations listed on the TripAdvisor page for Barbuda were actually in Antigua.

Hurricane Irma

22 years after Hurricane Luis, Hurricane Irma caused catastrophic damage when it made landfall on the island on 6 September 2017. Prime Minister Gaston Browne stated that the Category 5 hurricane had destroyed 95% of the structures and vehicles on the island. Initial estimates showed that at least 60% of the island's residents were homeless because of the disaster. All communications with Barbuda were down for a time; the storm had destroyed most of the communications system.

On 8 September 2017, the government began to evacuate the entire island (with residents moved to Antigua) in anticipation of the Category 4 Hurricane Jose, which was approaching from the east. Nearly 1,800 residents were evacuated to Antigua; some were accommodated in the Sir Vivian Richards cricket stadium. A hurricane warning for Jose was issued for several islands, including Barbuda.

On 14 September, Ronald Sanders, Ambassador to the United States, described the situation on Barbuda:  "There is no electricity there, there is no potable water anymore, there is no structure in which people can survive. We have a mammoth task on our hands." He also stated this is the first time in 300 years that the island has not had a single living person on it.  Sanders said, "We are a small island community — the gross domestic product of Antigua is $1 billion a year. We cannot afford to take on this responsibility by ourselves. Barbuda is not just a disaster, it's a humanitarian crisis. We are hopeful that the international community will come to our aid, not because we're begging for something we want, but because we're begging for something that is needed."

The United States Agency for International Development confirmed its commitment to provide coordination between the government and aid organizations; it also sent a Disaster Assistance Response Team. On 8 September, the first of three cargo planes arrived in Antigua from the US, with over 120,000 pounds of relief supplies for Barbudans. The cost was covered by the Government of Antigua and Barbuda and with donations from Martin Franklyn and the Coleman Company in the US.

An estimate published by Time indicated that over $100 million would be required to rebuild homes and infrastructure. In a statement, Sanders stated that the reconstruction may cost up to $300 million. Philmore Mullin, Director of Barbuda's National Office of Disaster Services, said that "all critical infrastructure and utilities are non-existent – food supply, medicine, shelter, electricity, water, communications, waste management... Public utilities need to be rebuilt in their entirety... It is optimistic to think anything can be rebuilt in six months ... In my 25 years in disaster management, I have never seen something like this."

A report in April 2018 indicated that many of the few people living on the island were making do in tents; some government buildings were still being repaired. By that time, water and electricity were available in government buildings, the police station, the hospital and the post office in Codrington. Prime minister Gaston Browne said there were plans to build a new runway for jets at the airport but no specifics had been released.

By February 2019, an estimated 75% of residents had returned from Antigua. Both China and the European Union funded rebuilding efforts which restored parts of the residential housing. 
Plans by Prime Minister Gaston Browne to overturn the century-old Barbudan communal land ownership by allowing residents to purchase land they occupy has been criticised as promoting "disaster capitalism". Seen in relation with the planned construction of a new international airport, critics voiced concerns that the main benefactors would not be the local populace, but international companies aiming to establish mass tourism.

Tourism
Barbuda's climate, pristine beaches, and geography attracted tourists for many years. Barbuda is served by Barbuda Codrington Airport and also had a ferry service to Antigua. Activities included swimming, snorkeling, fishing, and caving. Years after Hurricane Luis, in August 2017, there were still only two operating resorts on the island, although plans were being made to build other resorts before Hurricane Irma.

Attractions that were popular included the Frigate Bird Sanctuary in the Codrington Lagoon, Martello Tower, a 19th-century fort and the Indian Cave with its two rock-carved petroglyphs. Other points of interest included the beautiful Pink Sands Beach, Darby's Cave, a sinkhole with a tropical rain forest inside and Highland House (called Willybob locally), the ruins of the 18th-century Codrington family home, and the Dividing Wall that separated the wealthy family from its slaves.

Geography
The capital and largest town is Codrington, with an estimated population of 1,300 (2011 Estimated). The island is mostly coral limestone with little topographical variation.

The island is susceptible to hurricanes between August and October.

Major Division Areas 
There are two major division areas on the island of Barbuda.

Major Division of Codrington (Codrington)

 90100 Codrington-North (Enumeration District)
 90200 Codrington-Central (Enumeration District)
 90300 Codrington-South (Enumeration District)

Rest of Barbuda

 Barbuda-North (Village and Enumeration District)
 Barbuda-South (Village and Enumeration District)
 Barbuda-East (Village and Enumeration District)

Electoral history 
The Barbudan parliamentary constituency was created before the 1976 elections.

Wildlife

Barbuda is home to some notable wildlife, including the Antiguan racer, which is among the rarest snakes in the world. The Lesser Antilles are home to four species of racers. All four have undergone severe range reductions; at least two subspecies are extinct, and another, A. antiguae, now occupies only 0.1% of its historical range.

Griswold's ameiva (Ameiva griswoldi) is a species of lizard in the genus Ameiva. It is endemic to Antigua and Barbuda and is found on both islands.

Climate
The climate is classified as tropical marine, which means that there is little seasonal temperature variation.

Education

Like in Antigua, the education in Barbuda follows the British system with its three levels: primary, secondary, and tertiary. It is free and compulsory for students up to the age of 16. The educational policy focuses on the philosophy that "each child should first be socialized as a human being and secondly as an economic unit of production." See also the Education in Antigua and Barbuda for more information about education in the island.

Sir McChesney George Secondary School is the island's public secondary school.

Demographics

Ethnic groups
 95.11% African descendant
 2.88% Mixed (Black/White)
 1.00% Mixed (Other)
 0.44% Hispanic
 0.13% Arab (Syrian, or Lebanese)
 0.13% Caucasian/White
 0.13% East Indian/India
 0.13% Other
 0.06% Don't know/Not stated

Country of birth
89.28% of the population were born in Antigua and Barbuda
2.76% from Guyana
1.70% from United States
1.07% from Contiguous United States
0.63% from United States Virgin Islands
1.50% from Dominica
1.19% from Jamaica
0.25% from Montserrat
0.75% from United Kingdom
 0.44% from Canada
 0.44% from Other Caribbean countries
 0.44% from Dominican Republic
 0.44% from St. Kitts and Nevis
 0.44% from St. Vincent and the Grenadines
 0.13% from Other European countries
 0.13% from Syria
 0.25% Not Stated
 0.06% from Other Latin or North American countries
 0.06% from St. Lucia

Government
The whole island is one constituency, has six enumeration districts and has a polling center at the Holy Trinity School.

The island is governed by the Barbuda Council.

See also

Further reading 
 Corbett, Jack. 2020. "Territory, islandness, and the secessionist imaginary: Why do very small communities favour autonomy over integration?" Nations and Nationalism.

References

External links

 Antigua and Barbuda's Government Information and Services
 Antigua & Barbuda Official Business Hub
 
 Barbudaful
 Embassy of Antigua and Barbuda in Madrid - His Excellency Dr. Dario Item is the Head of Mission.
 Honorary Consulate General of Antigua and Barbuda in the Principality of Monaco

 
1670s establishments in the Caribbean
1678 establishments in North America
1678 establishments in the British Empire
Dependencies of Antigua and Barbuda
Former English colonies
Islands of Antigua and Barbuda
States and territories established in 1678